Olethreutes tilianum, the basswood olethreute, is a species of tortricid moth in the family Tortricidae.

The MONA or Hodges number for Olethreutes tilianum is 2795.

References

Further reading

External links

 

Olethreutini
Moths described in 1923